Fred Lewis Markham (July 3, 1902 – September 28, 1984) was an American architect in the early 20th century who designed movie theatres and many buildings on the campus of Brigham Young University (BYU) in Provo, Utah.

Biography
Markham was born in Spanish Fork, Utah.  His family moved to Provo in 1911 and in that year he began to study at the Brigham Young University Training School.  He graduated from Brigham Young High School in 1919 and from Brigham Young University in 1923.  He majored in math with a minor in chemistry.  From 1924 to 1926 he served as a missionary for the Church of Jesus Christ of Latter-day Saints in the Eastern States Mission.

Markham then went on to study at the Massachusetts Institute of Technology where he received a degree in architecture.

Architectural career

Markham designed many school buildings of a variety of functions including many buildings on the campus of Brigham Young University.  These include the LaVell Edwards Stadium, Carillon Bell Tower, Smith Fieldhouse, Eyring Science Center, Joseph Smith Memorial Building, Knight Magnum Building, Herald R. Clark Building, David O. McKay Building, Wilkinson Student Center, Thomas L. Martin Building, John A. Widtsoe Building, James E. Talmadge Math and Computer Building and many other buildings.  Many of these buildings are built with beige brick which has become a trademark of the many buildings built while Markham was active as an architect.  Several of these were in collaboration with other architects. Markham also designed the Student Union Buildings at Snow College, Utah State University and the University of Utah.  He also designed Provo High School.

Many theaters were designed by Markham including the SCERA Center for the Arts in Orem, Utah, the Arch Theatre in Spanish Fork, Utah and the Huish Theatres in Riverton, Utah and Payson, Utah.

Religious buildings include the Ogden Stake Tabernacle (the last tabernacle commissioned by the LDS Church), and the Salt Lake Monument Park Ward Chapel.

Two works by Markham are listed on the National Register of Historic Places:
Provo Third Ward Chapel and Amusement Hall, Provo, Utah, NRHP-listed
Beers House-Hotel, 1930 renovations designed by Markham, in Pleasonton, Utah, NRHP-listed

Personal life

Markham also served as the first president of the Utah Heritage Foundation.

In the 1960s and 1970s Markham served for thirteen years as president of the Utah Stake, later called the Provo Utah Central Stake.

Images of works

References

External links
 Black, Susan Easton and Charles D. Tate Jr., Joseph Smith: The Prophet, the Man (Provo: BYU Religious Studies Center, n. d.) p. xli
 http://cinematreasures.org/architect/328/
 http://www.byhigh.org/Alumni_K_to_O/Markham-FredL/FLM.html

1902 births
1984 deaths
20th-century Mormon missionaries
American leaders of the Church of Jesus Christ of Latter-day Saints
American Mormon missionaries in the United States
Brigham Young University alumni
Brigham Young University staff
MIT School of Architecture and Planning alumni
People from Spanish Fork, Utah
Utah State University people
Architects of Latter Day Saint religious buildings and structures
Architects from Utah
20th-century American architects
Latter Day Saints from Utah
Brigham Young High School alumni